Rouvray is a commune in the waniCôte-d'Or department in eastern France.

Population

Environment 
Rouvray lies within the Morvan Regional Natural Park.

See also
Communes of the Côte-d'Or department
Parc naturel régional du Morvan

References

Communes of Côte-d'Or